The River Kensey is a river in east Cornwall, England, UK which is a tributary of the River Tamar.

The river rises at Kensey in the parish of Treneglos and flows generally east to the south of Tresmeer and Egloskerry and then divides the town of Launceston from its suburb Newport before flowing into the Tamar about a mile east of Launceston.

References

External links

River Kensey; Explore Britain

Launceston, Cornwall
Kensey
1Kensey